

Events

January events
 January 27 – MBTA purchases several rail lines in New England from Penn Central to form the basis of the new commuter system's network.

February events 
 February 26 – Chessie System is incorporated to become the parent corporation of a combined B&O/C&O/WM railroad system.

March events
 March 30 – Toronto's Yonge Subway is extended to York Mills station.

May events
 May 21 – Passenger traffic begins on the Bay Area Rapid Transit (BART) Concord line, through the  Berkeley Hills Tunnel between Oakland and Orinda, California beneath the Berkeley Hills.

June events
 June 3 – The Norwegian State Railways open Lieråsen Tunnel on the Drammen Line between Asker and Lier.
 June 22 – The EMD SDP40F diesel locomotive enters revenue service with Amtrak.

August events
 August 17 – The last DB Class E 40 leaves the gates of the Krupp factory in Essen.

September events
 September 28 – Amtrak's Turboliners make their first run on the Chicago–St Louis corridor.

November events
 November 5 – Bay Area Rapid Transit Peninsula service starts between Downtown San Francisco and Daly City.
 November 7 – Frontier Series Canadian ten-dollar note introduced depicting the Canadian passenger train hauled by an EMD F40PH diesel-electric locomotive.

December events
 December 19 – The Ealing rail crash occurred when an express train from London Paddington to Oxford derails at speed between Ealing Broadway and West Ealing. Ten passengers are killed and 94 injured

Unknown date events
 The isolated coal hauler, the Black Mesa and Lake Powell Railroad, opens in Northern Arizona, the world's first line to use 50,000 V overhead line power.
 Transcameroon Railway extended to N'Gaoundéré.
 John W. Barriger III becomes president of the Boston and Maine Railroad.

Accidents

References